The following is a list of libraries in Ghana.

Table

See also
 List of universities in Ghana
 Ghana Library Authority

References

Further reading
Published in the 20th century

External links
 Consortium of Academic and Research Libraries in Ghana
 Ghana Library Board
 Digital libraries in Ghana, 2008

 
Libraries
Ghana
Libraries